Jean Népomucène Hermann Nast (1754–1817) was founder of a porcelain manufacture that pioneered a process of high relief, multicolored hard-paste porcelain.

Nast was born in Austria.  He worked at a state porcelain workshop at the Palace of Versailles before starting his own factory, the manufacture de Nast, in 1783. There, Nast collaborated with French chemist Louis-Nicolas Vauquelin in introducing new intensely colored glazes. At the beginning of the 19th century the manufacture had risen to prominence, rivalling the manufacture nationale de Sèvres, supplying French nobility, the government of the French Directory, Napoleon I, and many European courts.

Following Nast's death at Paris in 1817, his sons continued to operate the factory until its sale in 1835.

References
 Margaret Brown Klapthor. Official White House China: 1789 to the Present. The Barra Foundation and Harry N. Abrams: 1999. .
 This article is partially translated from the article Jean Népomucène Hermann Nast on the French Wikipedia.

1754 births
1817 deaths
Austrian businesspeople
Porcelain of France
French decorative artists
French potters
Burials at Père Lachaise Cemetery